Proverb Gabriel Jacobs, Jr. (May 25, 1935 – April 18, 2016) was an American football offensive and defensive lineman in the National Football League for the Philadelphia Eagles and the New York Giants.  He also played in the American Football League for the New York Titans and the Oakland Raiders.  Jacobs played college football at Modesto Junior College and the University of California.  He was drafted in the second round of the 1958 NFL Draft. Jacobs self-published his memoir, Autobiography of an Unknown Football Player, in 2014. He died in 2016 at the age of 80.

References

1935 births
2016 deaths
People from Marksville, Louisiana
Players of American football from Louisiana
American football offensive linemen
American football defensive linemen
California Golden Bears football players
Philadelphia Eagles players
New York Giants players
New York Titans (AFL) players
Oakland Raiders players
American Football League players